Aenny Loewenstein (Anna Loewenstein, 1871 - 5 May 1925) was a German painter and graphic artist. Her works include portraits, landscapes and everyday scenes; she mainly created etchings and gouaches.

Biography 
Loewenstein was born in 1871, in Berlin, Germany.

In 1898, she joined the Verein der Berliner Künstlerinnen. She remained a member until 1918. From 1904 to 1907, she studied with Margarete Hoenerbach. From 1906 to 1908, she worked as a teacher at the German Art Cooperative; She participated in association exhibitions.

In 1914, Loewenstein was awarded a silver medal at the International Exhibition of Books and Graphics in Leipzig.

In 1925 she died of suicide in Berlin.

References 

1871 births
1925 deaths